The Group of Patriotic Democrats is a registered political party in Burkina Faso (formerly Upper Volta).

The GDP is a leftist party founded in 1989.

Its secretary general is Issa Tiendrebéogo.

At the legislative elections of 1997 the GDP won 0.6% of the popular vote and no seats.

Political parties in Burkina Faso